Naukydes of Argos (4th century BCE) was a Greek sculptor from Argos.

Taught under Polykleitos, he created a statue of gold and ivory of Hebe for the temple of Hera in Argos; also, statues of Hecate, Hermes, of the poet Erinna, and Phrixus. The discobolus of Naukydes was identified by Ennio Quirino Visconti, as mentioned by Pliny (Haskell and Penny 1981:200).

He eventually became teacher to Polykleitos the Younger, son of his old teacher.

External links
Answers for Naukydes at Answers.com

4th-century BC Greek sculptors
Ancient Argives